Magical Girl Friendship Squad: Origins is an American adult animated sitcom on Syfy's late-night block, TZGZ created by Kelsey Stephanides and starring Anna Akana, Brianna Baker, Anika Noni Rose, and Estelle. It follows two directionless young women who must figure out how to save the Universe. It is the pilot series of Magical Girl Friendship Squad, which began airing on Syfy's late night programming block TZGZ on September 26, 2020, with six 15-minute episodes in its first season.

Plot 
The series is a female-driven comedy about Alex (Baker) and Daisy (Akana), two women in their 20s, who are given the duty of saving the universe, as soon as they get their lives together and pay their rent.

Characters

Main 

 Alex (voiced by Brianna "Bedes" Baker) who thinks of becoming a barista at a coffee shop in the local area, before meeting Nut.
 Daisy (voiced by Anna Akana) is a friend of Alex. She is also a stoner and antihero.
 Nut (voiced by Anika Noni Rose) is a red panda who gives Daisy and Alex the ability to transform into magical girls, allowing them to work together to save the universe.

Recurring 
 Corporate executive (voiced by Daisy Hobbs)

Guests 
 Verus (voiced by Estelle)

Episodes

Production

Development 
Magical Girl Friendship Squad Origins is an anime-inspired animation created by Kelsey Stephanides. The show began airing on Syfy's new adult animation block, TZGZ in January 2020. This pilot series was written by Diana McCorry, who created Human Kind Of. Stephanides stated that this series was a parody of the magical girl subgenre and set up the characters, which later were expanded upon in the main show.

In 2015, while in school at New York University, studying Media, Culture and Communications, Stephanides, an avid fan of the magical girl genre, came up with the idea for the show. After talking to her professor, James Belfer of Cartuna, he told her to pitch it to Cartuna, which loved the show. As a result, the production on the series began, meant to be a "short-form pitch to networks," and it was pitched around for years until 2019, when SYFY picked it up, wanting to reboot it, polish it more, and have longer episodes. That led to the creation of the main show, Magical Girl Friendship Squad. Stephanides also noted how this pilot show effected the main show, like the idea of Nut, an animal companion and partner which helps the protagonists, and is somehow the creator of the universe, saying it is "hilarious and adorable."

Release
After its release in January 2020, it continued to air on SYFY's programming block through the year.

Crew 
The show is produced by Cartuna, a New York animation studio. Krystal "K" Downs is the animation director, Kelsey Stephanides is the showrunner, and Diana McCorry is development producer (and writer) of the show. Like with the main show, Adam Belfer and James Belfer were executive producers, although for this pilot show, Daniel Shepard and Stephanides were also executive producers.

Casting 
Anna Akana voiced Daisy in this series and would also do so in the main show, titled Magical Girl Friendship Squad. Additionally, Brianna Baker voiced Alex, Anika Noni Rose voiced Nut, and Estelle was a guest star.

LGBTQ representation 

Six episodes of the adult animation, inspired by Sailor Moon and other magical girl anime, began airing on Syfy, features two women, Alex and Daisy. The latter is a lesbian who sleeps with a woman during the second episode of the show.

Reception
Reception to the show has been mixed. Joyce Slaton on Common Sense Media who called the humor mature and filled with "iffy topics," and strong language, with the protagonists, Daisy and Alex, doing drugs, drinking, and joking about smoking pot. She noted that one of the pair, Daisy, woke up "with a woman in her bed" and vomiting after an "intense hangover," while describing their battles with creatures "played for laughs," along with bursts of sci-fi/fantasy and blood. She said that the protagonists often treat people with kindness while villains are "dispatched quickly and with no emotions," saying that both protagonists have atypical "body types for anime," wearing costumes modeled on Sailor Moon, and noted the "agreeably loopy surreal fantasy" of the show.

Notes

References

External links 
 
 Clips and full episodes of Magical Girl Friendship Squad: Origins on Syfy
 Full episodes of Magical Girl Friendship Squad: Origins on NBC's website
 YouTube watch page

2020s American adult animated television series
2020s American animated comedy television series
2020s American comic science fiction television series
2020s American LGBT-related comedy television series
2020s American sitcoms
2020 American television series debuts
American adult animated adventure television series
American adult animated science fiction television series
Animated space adventure television series
American adult animated comedy television series
American animated sitcoms
American flash adult animated television series
Anime-influenced Western animated television series
Animated television series about extraterrestrial life
English-language television shows
Syfy original programming
TZGZ
Television series by Universal Television
2020s American LGBT-related animated television series
Cartuna
LGBT speculative fiction television series